Safet Sušić Pape is a bestseller novel by Bosnian writer Zlatko Topčić, published in 2007. 

This book is a biography in novel form of one of the world's best football players of his time, Safet Sušić. The novel caused great interest and became a hit in Bosnia and Herzegovina and France, where Sušić spent most of his career.

References

2007 novels
Fiction set in the 21st century
Bosnia and Herzegovina culture
Bosnia and Herzegovina literature
Novels set in Bosnia and Herzegovina